Burn the Witch may refer to:

Burn the Witch (EP), a 2008 EP by Stone Gods
"Burn the Witch" (Gotham), the second episode of the third season of Gotham
Burn the Witch (manga), a Japanese manga series by Tite Kubo
"Burn the Witch" (Queens of the Stone Age song), a 2005 song by Queens of the Stone Age
"Burn the Witch" (Radiohead song), a 2016 song by Radiohead

See also
Burn Witch Burn (disambiguation)
Burning Witch, an American doom metal band
Burning Witch, a Swiss heavy/power metal band
Burning the Witches, a 1984 album by Warlock
Witch burning, death by burning in a witch-hunt
Witchburner, a 1999 EP by Witchery